Richard K. Willard (born September 1, 1948) is an American attorney who served as the United States Assistant Attorney General for the Civil Division from 1983 to 1988.

See also 
 List of law clerks of the Supreme Court of the United States (Seat 2)

References

External links

1948 births
Living people
United States Assistant Attorneys General for the Civil Division
Texas Republicans
Law clerks of the Supreme Court of the United States